Saint Stephen is a civil parish in Charlotte County, New Brunswick, Canada, located in the southwestern corner of the province. It comprises one town, two local service districts (LSDs), and part of a third LSD, all of which are members of the Southwest New Brunswick Service Commission (SNBSC).

The Census subdivision of the same name includes all of the parish except the town of St. Stephen.

Origin of name
Historian William F. Ganong believed the name suggested by other Saint names in the area. Five of the original six mainland parishes of Charlotte County used names of major saints recognised by the Church of England: Andrew (Scotland), David (Wales), George (England), Patrick (Ireland), and Stephen.

History
Saint Stephen Parish was established in 1786 as one of Charlotte County's original parishes, including Dufferin Parish, but only extending as far north as Hayman Hill and Swede Road.

Boundaries
Saint Stephen Parish is bounded:

 on the north by a line beginning at a point about 1.2 kilometres east-northeast of where Route 735 crosses Hoodleys Brook, then running east-northeasterly along the prolongation of the northern line of a grant to Robert Watson, the Watson grant, and the prolongation to a point on the eastern shore of Moores Mills Lake about 600 metres north of the kink in Murphy Road;
 on the east by a line running downstream through Moores Mills Lake and Dennis Stream to where the stream crosses the eastern line of the tier of grants along Route 750, about 350 metres east of the junction of Marks Road and Route 750, then southerly along the eastern line of the tier and its prolongation to the rear line of grants fronting on the St. Croix River, then westerly along the rear line to the Old Bay Road, then southwesterly along the road to the mouth of Dennis Stream;
 on the south and southwest by the St. Croix River;
 on the northwest by a line beginning on the St. Croix about 1.5 kilometres upstream of the end of Chandler Road, at the prolongation of the northwestern line of a grant to Isabella Boyce on the western side of Mohannes Stream, then running northeasterly along the prolongation, the Boyce grant, and the prolongation to meet the western line of grants along Route 735, then northerly along the western line of the tier of grants, crossing Route 735 and continuing on to the starting point.

Evolution of boundaries
The original northern line of Saint Stephen began near Valley Road and ran westerly through Hayman Hill and Swede Road to the St. Croix River. The identity of the St. Croix was still in dispute, the British claiming the Penobscot as the river where Samuel de Champlain overwintered, the Americans claimed the Magaguadavic. In 1798 the boundary commission settled on the Schoodic River following the discovery of Champlain's site on Dochets Island and the river was officially renamed St. Croix.

In 1813 the northern line was extended north to match the northern line of Saint David Parish, adding everything south of a line from Saint David's northwestern corner to north of the mouth of King Brook Lake. Basswood Ridge, DeWolfe, Gleason Road, Oak Hill, Pomeroy Ridge, Scotch Ridge, and Upper Little Ridge are all in the area that was added.

In 1823 the northern and northwestern parts of the parish formed the newly erected Saint James Parish, giving the parish its current northern boundary.

In 1873 the eastern part of the parish was erected as Dufferin Parish, giving the parish its current boundaries.

Municipality
The town of St. Stephen is in the southeastern corner of the parish, stretching from nearly the eastern line of the parish to Milltown.

Local service districts
All LSDs assess for only the basic LSD services of fire protection, police services, land use planning, emergency measures, and dog control.

Saint Stephen Parish
The local service district of the parish of Saint Stephen originally comprised all of the parish outside the twin towns of St. Stephen and Milltown. It has since reduced to the southwestern corner of the mainland and the islands of the St. Croix River.

The LSD was established in 1969 to assess for community services, in this case to provide ambulance service after local funeral homes ceased doing so. Fire protection was added in 1970.

The taxing authority is 518.00 Saint Stephen.

Dennis-Weston
Dennis-Weston comprises all of the mainland east from the rear line of grants along Route 740.

The LSD was established in 1988 to first aid and ambulance services.

The taxing authority is 529.00 Dennis-Weston.

Western Charlotte
Western Charlotte extends into Saint Stephen Parish from Saint James Parish.

Former municipalities
Milltown was a town on the western edge of St. Stephen, with Boundary Street as the border between them. It was incorporated in 1873, and amalgamated with St. Stephen on 1 October 1973 as St. Stephen – Milltown, which was renamed St. Stephen in 1975.
Upper Mills was a town along the St. Croix River from slightly west of the mouth of Mohannes Stream to the Bailey Rips. It was incorporated in 1874 and dissolved in 1896.

Communities
Communities at least partly within the parish. bold indicates an incorporated municipality

 Barter Settlement
 Blackland
 Burnt Hill
 Five Corners
 Four Corners
 Hayman Hill
 Heathland
 Maxwell Crossing
 Mayfield
 Mohannes
 Old Ridge
 St. Stephen
 Milltown
 Union Mills
 Upper Mills
 Valley Road

Bodies of water 
Bodies of water at least partly within the parish.
 St. Croix River
 Woodland Flowage
 Dennis Stream
 Mohannes Stream
 Kendricks Lake
 Moores Mills Lake

Islands 
Islands at least partly within the parish.
 Butler Islands
 numerous unnamed islands in the St. Croix River

Other notable places
Parks, historic sites, and other noteworthy places at least partly within the parish.
 St. Stephen Airport

Demographics
Population total does not include town of St. Stephen

Population

Language

Access Routes
Highways and numbered routes that run through the parish, including external routes that start or finish at the parish limits:

Highways

Principal Routes

Secondary Routes:
None

External Routes:
None

See also
List of parishes in New Brunswick

Notes

References

External links
 LSD of Dennis Weston
 Town of St. Stephen
 Western Charlotte Local Service District

Local service districts of Charlotte County, New Brunswick
Parishes of Charlotte County, New Brunswick